Chris Bartlett may refer to:

 Chris Bartlett (writer) (born 1976), London-based writer and journalist
 Chris Bartlett (musician) (born 1981), American guitarist, music teacher, author and singer-songwriter
 Chris Bartlett (activist) (born 1966), American gay activist, feminist, educator, and researcher

See also
 Christopher A. Bartlett (born 1943), Australian organizational theorist